Mike Kubat is a Canadian television writer and story editor. He has worked on such animated series as Mickey and the Roadster Racers, Atomic Betty, Chop Socky Chooks, and Ed, Edd n Eddy. In 2005, he received a Leo Award nomination for Best Screenwriter in an Animation Program or Series for the Atomic Betty episode "Spindly Tam Kanushu". Kubat originally started out wanting to be in a rock band, later becoming an accountant, and finally settling comfortably in his career writing for animation.

Television work

References

External links
 Duck, You Sucker! Productions official website
 
 

Canadian television writers
Living people
Year of birth missing (living people)